"It Came Upon the Midnight Clear", sometimes rendered as "It Came Upon a Midnight Clear", is an 1849 poem and Christmas carol written by Edmund Sears, pastor of the Unitarian Church in Wayland, Massachusetts. In 1850, Sears' lyrics were set to "Carol", a tune written for the poem the same year at his request, by Richard Storrs Willis. This pairing remains the most popular in the United States, while in Commonwealth countries, the lyrics are set to "Noel", a later adaptation by Arthur Sullivan from an English melody.

History 

Edmund Sears composed the five-stanza poem in common metre doubled during 1849. It first appeared on December 29, 1849, in The Christian Register in Boston, Massachusetts.

Sears served the Unitarian congregation in Wayland, Massachusetts, before moving on to a larger congregation at First Church of Christ, Unitarian, in Lancaster, also known as The Bulfinch Church, for its design by Charles Bulfinch. After seven years, he suffered a breakdown and returned to Wayland. He wrote It Came Upon the Midnight Clear while serving as a part-time preacher in Wayland. Writing during a period of personal melancholy, and with news of revolution in Europe and the United States' war with Mexico fresh in his mind, Sears portrayed the world as dark, full of "sin and strife", and not hearing the Christmas message.

Sears is said to have written these words at the request of his friend, William Parsons Lunt, pastor of United First Parish Church, Quincy, Massachusetts, for Lunt's Sunday school. One account says the carol was first performed by parishioners gathered in Sears' home on Christmas Eve, but to what tune the carol was sung is unknown as Willis' familiar melody was not written until the following year.

According to Ken Sawyer, Sears' song is remarkable for its focus not on Bethlehem, but on his own time, and on the contemporary issue of war and peace. Written in 1849, it has long been assumed to be Sears' response to the just ended Mexican–American War. The song has been included in many of the Christmas albums recorded by numerous singers in the modern era.

Melody 

In 1850, Richard Storrs Willis, a composer who trained under Felix Mendelssohn, wrote the melody called "Carol". This melody is most often set in the key of B-flat major in a 6/8 time signature. "Carol" is still the most widely known tune to the song in the United States.

In Commonwealth countries, the tune called "Noel", which was adapted from an English melody in 1874 by Arthur Sullivan, is the usual accompaniment. This tune also appears as an alternative in The Hymnal 1982, the hymnal of the United States Episcopal Church.

Lyrics 

The full song comprises five stanzas. Some versions, including the United Methodist Hymnal and Lutheran Book of Worship, omit verse three, while others (including The Hymnal 1982) omit verse four. Several variations also exist to Sears' original lyrics.

See also
 List of Christmas carols

References

External links 

Setting by Arthur Sullivan at IMSLP

American Christian hymns
American Christmas songs
19th-century hymns
Christmas carols